Antonello Petrei (born 24 November 1972) is a former Italian male long-distance runner who competed at individual senior level at the IAAF World Half Marathon Championships.

References

External links
 

1972 births
Living people
Italian male long-distance runners